Robert Wellesley Mann (1924, Brooklyn, New York – 2006) was a pioneer in the field of medical prosthetics. 

Mann was a professor at the Massachusetts Institute of Technology,  where professor of mechanical engineering for almost 40 years and a member of the Institute of Medicine of the National Academy of Sciences.

Biography
Mann graduated from Brooklyn Technical High School before serving in the Pacific theater in the Army during WWII.  He came to MIT in 1947 on the GI Bill and received the S.B. degree in 1950, the S.M. in 1951 and the Sc.D. in 1957.

Boston Arm
In September 1968, a team of physicians and designers, led by Mann, introduced the "Boston Digital Arm", the first prosthetic limb controlled by a brain–computer interface, wherein the wearer could control the movement of the arm by the electric signals sent by the brain to electronic instruments designed to interpret the signals.

References

Sources
Professor Robert W. Mann, leader in prosthetics, dies at 81

External Links

1924 births
2006 deaths
American biomedical engineers
 MIT School of Engineering faculty
Massachusetts Institute of Technology alumni
United States Army personnel of World War II